Swiss ATSEP Technical Association (SATTA) is the association of Swiss Air Navigation Service (ANS) technical professionals a and member of IFATSEA (International Federation of Air Traffic Safety Electronics Associations). SATTA represents more than 120 professionals (ATSEP) from different companies spread over Switzerland.

External links 
 SATTA Website
 IFATSEA Website

Aviation-related professional associations
Air traffic control in Europe
Aviation organisations based in Switzerland